Andrew Torgashev (born May 29, 2001) is an American figure skater. He is the 2019 CS Asian Open Trophy silver medalist, the 2016 CS Tallinn Trophy bronze medalist, the 2018 JGP Lithuania champion, the 2015 U.S. national junior champion, and the 2023 U.S. national bronze medalist.

Personal life
Andrew Torgashev was born May 29, 2001, in Coral Springs, Florida. He is the son of Ilona Melnichenko and Artem Torgashev, who competed for the Soviet Union in ice dancing and pair skating respectively. He attended North Broward Middle School in Coconut Creek, Florida.

Career

Early career 
Torgashev began learning to skate in 2006. He was awarded the juvenile bronze medal at the U.S. Junior Championships in December 2010. He won the U.S. national juvenile title in the 2011–2012 season and the U.S. intermediate title the following season.

He placed fourth in the novice men's category at the 2014 U.S. Championships.

2014–2015 season 
Torgashev became age-eligible for international junior events in the 2014–2015 season. Competing on the ISU Junior Grand Prix series, he placed fourth in Ostrava, Czech Republic, and fifth in Tallinn, Estonia.

After taking the junior gold medal at the Eastern Sectionals, he won the junior title at the U.S. Championships, setting U.S. junior men's records in the free skate and total score. He was assigned to the 2015 World Junior Championships and finished tenth at the event, which was held in March in Tallinn.

2015–2016 season 
Torgashev fractured his right ankle in June 2015 while practicing a quad toe loop. He underwent surgery in June to insert three screws, which were removed from his ankle in January 2016. As a result, he missed the entire skating season. He worked on his edges, stroking, and speed after returning to the ice.

2016–2017 season 
Torgashev returned to competition in July 2016. Competing in the 2016 Junior Grand Prix series, he won silver in Russia and placed fourth in Germany.

Making his senior international debut, he took the bronze medal at the 2016 CS Tallinn Trophy in November. He finished eleventh in the senior ranks in January at the 2017 U.S. Championships.

At the 2017 World Junior Championships, he placed twenty-fifth in the short program and did not qualify to the free skate.

2017–2018 season 
Torgashev placed sixth at the Philadelphia Summer International in early August 2017. During the 2017 Junior Grand Prix series, he won silver in Belarus with a personal best total score 212.71 points and then placed fourth in Italy. He qualified to the JGP Final in Nagoya, Japan, where he placed sixth. Torgashev also finished sixth at the 2017 CS Warsaw Cup. In January, at the 2018 U.S. Championships, he ranked ninth in the short program, fourteenth in the free skate, and thirteenth overall.

In June, he announced that he had relocated to Colorado Springs, Colorado to work full-time with Christy Krall. Erik Schultz and Joshua Farris also became members of his coaching team.

2018–2019 season 
In August 2018, Torgashev won the senior men's title at the 2018 Philadelphia Summer International. At the 2018 Junior Grand Prix in Bratislava, Slovakia, he placed fifth in the short program, third in the free skate, and fourth overall. In September, he won gold at JGP Lithuania in Kaunas after placing second in the short program and first in the free skate.
These results qualified him for the 2018–19 Junior Grand Prix Final in Vancouver, Canada. Due to a fractured right toe, he withdrew from the competition and was off the ice for eight weeks, until around mid-November. In January, he finished seventh in the senior ranks at the 2019 U.S. Championships.

In March 2019, he won silver at the Egna Spring Trophy.

2019–2020 season 
Torgashev started the season at the 2019 Philadelphia Summer International, where he won the event.
He competed in the JGP series, placing fourth in Riga, Latvia, at the JGP Croatia. He placed second in the short program with a new personal best, and sixth in the free program, and fourth overall.  He then competed at the senior level at the 2019 CS Asian Open Trophy, winning the silver medal.

Competing at the 2020 U.S. Championships, Torgashev placed third in the short program, skating a clean program that included a quad toe loop.  He struggled in the free skate, falling twice and stepping out of an under-rotated quad toe attempt in the program's second half.  Fifth in that segment, he dropped to fifth place overall.

Assigned to the 2020 World Junior Championships, Torgashev placed third in the short program, winning a small bronze medal.  Torgashev fell four times in the long program, placing eleventh in that segment and dropping to eighth place overall.

2020–2021 season 
In November 2019, Torgashev announced a coaching change as he moved from Colorado to California to train with Rafael Arutyunyan at Great Park Ice in Irvine.

2022–2023 season 
After missing the last two seasons with injury, Torgashev qualified for the 2023 US Championships in San Jose. By his own account, he entered the event hoping to finish in the top ten. Torgashev placed fifth in the short program with a score of 78.78. He then won the free skate over expected favourite Ilia Malinin and returning former national champion Jason Brown, and won the bronze medal overall with a total score of 255.56 points. He called the result "surreal."

Because Torgashev had not competed internationally since 2020, he lacked the technical minimum scores required to attend ISU championships and could not obtain them in time to be assigned to the 2023 Four Continents Championships. He was provisionally selected for the 2023 World Championships in Saitama, Japan, pending his acquisition of the requisite scores at the International Challenge Cup.

Programs

Competitive highlights 
CS: Challenger Series; JGP: Junior Grand Prix

Juvenile through novice career

Detailed results

Senior level

Junior level 
Small medals for short and free programs awarded only at ISU Championships.

References

External links 
 

2001 births
American male single skaters
American people of Russian descent
American people of Ukrainian descent
Living people
People from Coral Springs, Florida